

346001–346100 

|-bgcolor=#f2f2f2
| colspan=4 align=center | 
|}

346101–346200 

|-bgcolor=#f2f2f2
| colspan=4 align=center | 
|}

346201–346300 

|-id=261
| 346261 Alexandrescu ||  || Harald Alexandrescu (1945–2005), a Romanian astronomer. || 
|}

346301–346400 

|-bgcolor=#f2f2f2
| colspan=4 align=center | 
|}

346401–346500 

|-bgcolor=#f2f2f2
| colspan=4 align=center | 
|}

346501–346600 

|-bgcolor=#f2f2f2
| colspan=4 align=center | 
|}

346601–346700 

|-bgcolor=#f2f2f2
| colspan=4 align=center | 
|}

346701–346800 

|-bgcolor=#f2f2f2
| colspan=4 align=center | 
|}

346801–346900 

|-id=810
| 346810 Giancabattisti ||  || Giancarlo Battisti (born 1942) is a very enthusiastic Italian amateur astronomer. He is the author of the graphical Atlas of Galaxies (2008). || 
|-id=886
| 346886 Middelburg || 2009 MB || Middelburg is an old Dutch city on the isle of Walcheren in the province of Zeeland that was built as a fortress against the Vikings. || 
|-id=889
| 346889 Rhiphonos ||  || Riphonus (Rhiphonos), one of the commanders of the Lamian centaurs in Greek mythology. He is one of the  twelve rustic spirits of the Lamos river set by Zeus to guard the infant Dionysos. Later, Riphonus joined Dionysus in his campaign against India. || 
|}

346901–347000 

|-bgcolor=#f2f2f2
| colspan=4 align=center | 
|}

References 

346001-347000